VA-23, nicknamed the Black Knights, was an Attack Squadron of the U.S. Navy, established as Reserve Fighter Squadron VF-653 in December 1949 at NAS Akron, Ohio. The squadron relocated to NAS Alameda on 16 April 1951. It was redesignated VF-151 on 4 February 1953, and as VA-151 on 7 February 1956. It was finally designated as VA-23 on 23 February 1959, and moved to NAS Lemoore on 30 September 1961. The squadron was disestablished on 1 April 1970.

Operational history
The squadron conducted its first combat strikes on 11 December 1951 during the Korean War.

In February 1955, it  provided air support during the evacuation of Chinese Nationalists from the Tachen Islands during the First Taiwan Straits Crisis.

In April 1968, VA-23 flew combat strikes around Khe Sanh, South Vietnam, in support of the besieged Marine base there.

Aircraft assignment
The squadron was assigned the following aircraft in the months shown:
 FG-1D - 1951
 F4U-4 - 1951
 F4U-4B - 1951
 F9F-2 - August 1952
 F9F-5 - October 1952
 F7U-3M - May 1955
 F7U-3 - June 1955
 F9F-8B - December 1956
 F9F-8 - January 1957
 FJ-4B - July 1957
 A4D-2 - May 1960
 A-4E - December 1962
 A-4F - July 1967

See also
 Attack aircraft
 History of the United States Navy
 List of inactive United States Navy aircraft squadrons

References

Attack squadrons of the United States Navy
Wikipedia articles incorporating text from the Dictionary of American Naval Aviation Squadrons